The 2010 Olivier Awards were held on 21 March 2010 at the Grosvenor House Hotel, London.

Winners and nominees

Productions with multiple nominations and awards
The following 25 productions, including one ballet and four operas, received multiple nominations:

 7: Spring Awakening
 6: Enron, Jerusalem
 5: A Little Night Music
 4: A View from the Bridge, Hello, Dolly, Sister Act
 3: A Streetcar Named Desire, Burnt by the Sun, Oliver, Priscilla, Queen of the Desert, Red, The Misanthrope, Three Days of Rain, Tristan und Isolde
 2: Afterlight, Cat on a Hot Tin Roof, Der fliegende Holländer, England People Very Nice, Hamlet, Lulu, Morecambe, Peter Grimes, The Mountaintop, The Priory

The following five productions, including one opera, received multiple awards:

 4: Spring Awakening
 3: Hello, Dolly
 2: A Streetcar Named Desire, Jerusalem, Tristan und Isolde

See also
 64th Tony Awards

References

External links
 Previous Olivier Winners – 2010
 "Olivier Award winners and nominees, 2010" at officiallondontheatre.co.uk
 "Olivier winner Rachel Weisz: I want to do a play every year" at thisislondon.co.uk, 22 March 2010

Laurence Olivier Awards ceremonies
Laurence Olivier
Laurence Olivier Awards
Laurence Olivier Awards
Laurence Olivier Awards